William H. Jacoby (1841 – 1905) was an American photographer. A series of his stereoscopic images were published as Jacoby's Artistic Views of Minnesota. The Getty Museum has some of his work in their collection.

His son Charles joined the firm and it became W.H. Jacoby & Son. Many of his images were used for postcards.

Gallery

References

1841 births
1905 deaths
19th-century American photographers